Yasushi Kuroiwa (born 27 September 1965) is a Japanese speed skater. He competed in the men's 500 metres event at the 1988 Winter Olympics.

References

External links
 

1965 births
Living people
Japanese male speed skaters
Olympic speed skaters of Japan
Speed skaters at the 1988 Winter Olympics
Sportspeople from Gunma Prefecture
Asian Games medalists in speed skating
Speed skaters at the 1986 Asian Winter Games
Speed skaters at the 1990 Asian Winter Games
Medalists at the 1990 Asian Winter Games
Asian Games bronze medalists for Japan
20th-century Japanese people